Diamonds become famous typically for some combination of their size, color and quality. Diamonds occur naturally in many different colors, so the largest diamond of a particular color may not be large in absolute terms, but it may still be considered very desirable. Diamonds may also have high valuations or sale prices, or go on to have a noteworthy ownership history, but this will tend to occur for diamonds that had some outstanding characteristic to begin with. As new diamonds are discovered, the uniqueness of existing ones may diminish and there is no agreed-upon measure of a large or a high-quality diamond, so strict inclusion criteria for notable diamonds are not attainable.

Diamond

A diamond is a solid form of the element carbon with its atoms arranged in a crystal structure called diamond cubic. At room temperature and pressure, another solid form of carbon known as graphite is the chemically stable form, but diamond almost never converts to it. Diamond has the highest hardness and thermal conductivity of any natural material, properties that are utilized in major industrial applications such as cutting and polishing tools. They are also the reason that diamond anvil cells can subject materials to pressures found deep in the Earth.

The name diamond is derived from the ancient Greek ἀδάμας (adámas), "proper", "unalterable", "unbreakable", "untamed", from ἀ- (a-), "un-" + δαμάω (damáō), "I overpower", "I tame". Diamonds are thought to have been first recognized and mined in India, where significant alluvial deposits of the stone could be found many centuries ago along the rivers Penner, Krishna and Godavari. Diamonds have been known in India for at least 3,000 years but most likely 6,000 years.

Diamonds have been treasured as gemstones since their use as religious icons in ancient India. Their usage in engraving tools also dates to early human history. The popularity of diamonds has risen since the 19th century because of increased supply, improved cutting and polishing techniques, growth in the world economy, and innovative and successful advertising campaigns.

List of diamonds

See also

 List of largest rough diamonds
 List of Golconda diamonds
 List of emeralds by size
 List of individual gemstones
 List of gold nuggets by size
 List of pearls by size
 List of sapphires by size

References

 

Diamonds